This list of dental schools includes major academic institutions in Australia that award advanced professional degrees in the field of dentistry.

New South Wales
Sydney Faculty of Dentistry - Graduate Entry
Charles Sturt University School of Dentistry

Victoria
Melbourne Dental School - Graduate Entry
La Trobe University School of Dentistry and Oral Health

South Australia
University of Adelaide School of Dentistry

Queensland
University of Queensland Faculty of Dentistry
James Cook University School of Dentistry
Griffith University School of Dentistry and Oral Health

Western Australia
University of Western Australia Faculty of Dentistry - Graduate Entry (est 2013)

See also
Royal Australasian College of Dental Surgeons

References

External links
Australian Dental Association
Australian Dental Council
Australian Dental Association NSW Centre for Professional Development

 
Australia
Australia health-related lists
Australia education-related lists